The 1985–86 Richmond Spiders men's basketball team represented the University of Richmond in National Collegiate Athletic Association (NCAA) Division I college basketball during the 1985–86 season. Richmond competed as a member of the Colonial Athletic Association (CAA; formerly known as the ECAC South Conference) under head basketball coach Dick Tarrant and played its home games at the Robins Center.

Richmond finished second behind Navy in the CAA regular-season standings with a 12–2 conference record, and lost in the semifinal round of the CAA tournament. The Spiders received an at-large bid to the 1986 NCAA tournament. As No. 11 seed in the East region, Richmond lost to No. 6 seed Saint Joseph's, 60–59, in the opening round.

Roster

Schedule and results

|-
!colspan=9 style=| Regular season

|-
!colspan=9 style=| CAA Tournament

|-
!colspan=9 style=| NCAA Tournament

Rankings

1986 NBA Draft

References

Richmond Spiders men's basketball seasons
Richmond
1985 in sports in Virginia
1986 in sports in Virginia
Richmond